OXM may refer to

 Official Xbox Magazine, a magazine published in the UK and US
 Object X-Machine, a variant of the X-machine
 Object XML Mapping, a software technique
 Ogg Extended Module, a lossy compressed file format for music